KDQN may refer to:

 KDQN (AM), a radio station (1390 AM) licensed to De Queen, Arkansas, United States
 KDQN-FM, a radio station (92.1 FM) licensed to De Queen, Arkansas, United States